Adams is a census-designated place in Burton Township, Adams County, Illinois, United States.

Adams was laid out in 1838.

Geography 

Demographics

As of the 2020 census there were 75 people, 28 households, and 16 families residing in the CDP. The racial makeup of the CDP was 93.33% White, 1.33% African American, 0.00% Native American, 0.00% Asian, 0.00% Pacific Islander, 0.00% from other races, and 5.33% from two or more races. Hispanic or Latino of any race were 1.33% of the population.

References

Unincorporated communities in Adams County, Illinois
Unincorporated communities in Illinois
1838 establishments in Illinois